SOBER-128 is a synchronous stream cipher designed by Hawkes and Rose (2003) and is a member of the SOBER family of ciphers. SOBER-128 was also designed to provide MAC (message authentication code) functionality.

Watanabe and Furuya (2004) showed a weakness in the MAC generation of SOBER-128 which means an attack could forge a message with probability 2−6. MAC functionality was deleted by Qualcomm from SOBER-128 reference code.

SOBER-128 takes a key up to 128 bits in length.

See also
 Helix
 Turing

References
 Dai Watanabe and Soichi Furuya, A MAC Forgery Attack on SOBER-128, FSE 2004. pp472–482.
 Philip Hawkes and Greg Rose, Primitive Specification for SOBER-128, IACR ePrint archive, 2003.

External links
 SOBER 128 page at Qualcomm Open Source

Broken stream ciphers
Stream ciphers